{{DISPLAYTITLE:C10H24N4}}
The molecular formula C10H24N4 (molar mass: 200.330 g/mol, exact mass: 200.2001 u) may refer to:

 Cyclam (1,4,8,11-tetraazacyclotetradecane)
 Tetrakis(dimethylamino)ethylene (TDAE)